The Thomas Crabtree Three-Decker is historic triple-decker house in Worcester, Massachusetts.  Built in 1914, it is a remarkably well-preserved and detailed example of the style in Worcester's University Park neighborhood.  It has a typical side hall plan, and a hip roof that sports a small gable dormer on the front elevation.  It has projecting bays on the front and left sides.  Its builder and first owner was Thomas Crabtree, a local factory supervisor.

The building was listed on the National Register of Historic Places in 1990.

See also
National Register of Historic Places listings in southwestern Worcester, Massachusetts
National Register of Historic Places listings in Worcester County, Massachusetts

References

Apartment buildings on the National Register of Historic Places in Massachusetts
Colonial Revival architecture in Massachusetts
Houses completed in 1914
Apartment buildings in Worcester, Massachusetts
Triple-decker apartment houses
National Register of Historic Places in Worcester, Massachusetts